The 2021 Hamburg Sea Devils season was the first season of the new Hamburg Sea Devils team in the inaugural season of the European League of Football. After winning the first ever match of the new ELF against Frankfurt Galaxy on a last second Phillip Friis Andersen Field Goal, the team went on to post a 7–3 record, winning their North Division and beating the Wroclaw Panthers in the playoffs before going on to lose the inaugural Championship Game to the Frankfurt Galaxy by a score of 32–30.

Regular season

Standings

Schedule

Source: europeanleague.football

Transactions
On July 6, head coach Ted Daisher was released, because of "different views and expectations regarding the philosophy and leadership of our team". He was replaced on an interim basis by offensive coordinator Andreas Nommensen, who was later confirmed as head coach for the rest of the season. 

On July 21, French linebacker Giovanni Nanguy was signed, after the team released 2 other linebackers, Jonas Tykfer and Paco Varol.

Roster

Notes

References 

Hamburg Sea Devils (ELF) seasons
Hamburg Sea Devils
Hamburg Sea Devils